Larmer Tree Festival is a three-day music, comedy and arts festival held annually at the Larmer Tree Gardens near Tollard Royal on the Wiltshire-Dorset border in England. 

It takes place in the Cranborne Chase Area of Outstanding Natural Beauty. Past events have included performances from Paloma Faith, Jake Bugg, First Aid Kit, Tom Odell, KT Tunstall, Tom Jones, Kae Tempest, Jools Holland and Gomez. 

The 2020 festival was cancelled as a result of the COVID-19 pandemic, and the event was not held in 2021 or 2022.

Location
The festival is held in the Larmer Tree Gardens, a Victorian pleasure ground founded by Augustus Pitt Rivers. it has a total capacity of 5000 audience members per day. 

The Larmer Tree itself was an ancient landmark tree on the ancient boundary between Wiltshire and Dorset. 

The festival takes place in a setting of lawns and gardens, dotted with Indian pavilions and Roman temples, with free-roaming peacocks and macaws, which also feature in much of the festival's branding.

Organization 

The first festival was held in 1990, founded by James Shepard, who was joined in 1993 by Julia Safe. Rob Challice joined as director in 2015, having previously managed the festival's music programming.

Following the 2018 festival, James Shepard and Julia Safe stepped down as directors. Rob Challice continued in his role, joined by new directors Lauren Down and James Strathallan.

Nearly 500 volunteers from the local area, covering 13 different roles, help out before, during and after the event, and it has links with many local organisations.

The festival organisers try to minimise its environmental impact, by such measures as recycling as much as possible and insisting on the use of biodegradable trays and wooden cutlery by the catering outlets at the event. They also encourage festival-goers to take green living measures such as lift-sharing by signing up to GoCarShare or Freewheelers, recycling and saving water on site.

Events
See Larmer Tree Festival line-ups for line-up listings.

The music line-up crosses four stages – Main Stage, Peacock Palace, The Social and Village Inn. The festival predominately features acoustic folk, indie-rock, jazz, country-folk, world music, reggae, roots and blues, plus the Late Night Larmer programme which includes DJs and disco beats. The Village Inn is the place for swing, ska and skiffle. 

The comedy covers all bases with past performers including Josie Long, Mark Watson, Dylan Moran, Sara Pascoe and Nish Kumar, new comers, Edinburgh Festival Fringe previews and live podcast recordings. 

The COVID-19 pandemic caused the cancellation of the 2020 event, and it was not held in 2021 or 2022. In late 2021 the organisers blamed COVID-related disruption to suppliers and contractors, and potential financial risks.

Facilities 
The festival offer a number of boutique camping options from traditional Gypsy-style caravans to luxuriously furnished Bell Tents. There are campsites to suit everyone including Quiet Camping, Family Camping, General Camping, Accessible Camping, Day Camping, Van Field with a panoramic views of the Cranborne Chase. The campsite next to the festival ground is free, with free hot showers. In 2006 the festival toilets won the UK Festival Awards 2006 Portaloo Sunset Award For Best Toilets.

Awards 
In 2008 the Larmer Tree Festival was nominated for five awards by UK Festival Awards: Best Small Festival (for festivals of 10,000 festival-goers or less); Best Lineup; Grass Roots Festival Award (for "the king of anti-commercialism"); Family Festival Award and Best Toilets. The festival made the shortlist in three categories: Best Small Festival, Family Festival Award and Best Toilets, and won the Family Festival Award when the results were announced at the awards ceremony in London on 30 October 2008.

References

External links

BBC page about the 2008 Festival
BBC page about the 2007 Festival, photographs
BBC page about the 2006 Festival
BBC page about the 2005 Festival
BBC page about the 2004 Festival
BBC page about the 2003 Festival

Music festivals in Wiltshire
Music festivals in Dorset
Recurring events established in 1991
1991 establishments in England